Helotiales is an order of the class Leotiomycetes within the division Ascomycota. The taxonomy within Helotiales has been debated. It has expanded significantly as genomic techniques for taxonomical identification have become more commonly used. , the order is estimated to contain 30 accepted families, 519 genera, and 6266 species.

Helotiales is the largest order of non-stromatic discomycetes that usually, but not always, have brightly coloured apothecia. Many members of the family have obviously cup-shaped ascomata with little or no stipes. They are usually found fruiting on coarse or large wood debris as well as on other organic matter.
Part of these discomycetes are limited to a specific host range, this goes as far as to not just being limited to one particular plant, additionally 
some species need a particular part of that plant.

Description
Helotiales is distinguished by its disc or cup-shaped apothecia.
Its asci are only slightly thickened in contrast to other Leotiomycetes
Most Helotiales species live as saprobes on soil humus, dead logs, manure and other organic matter.
The order includes most fungi that engage in ericoid mycorrhiza, including Rhizoscyphus ericae, Meliniomyces species and Cairneyella variabilis.
The order contains some of the most severe plant pathogens such as Monilinia fructicola (brown rot on stone fruits), Sclerotinia sclerotiorum (lettuce drop and other diseases), D. rosae (black spot of roses), Sclerotium cepivorum (soft rot of onions) and Botrytis cinerea.

Families

Amicodiscaceae
Arachnopezizaceae
Bryoglossaceae
Cenangiaceae
Chlorociboriaceae
Chlorospleniaceae
Chrysodiscaceae
Dermateaceae
Discinellaceae
Drepanopezizaceae
Gelatinodiscaceae
Godroniaceae
Hamatocanthoscyphaceae
Helotiaceae
Hemiphacidiaceae
Heterosphaeriaceae
Hyaloscyphaceae
Hydrocinaceae
Lachnaceae
Loramycetaceae
Mitrulaceae
Mollisiaceae
Neolauriomycetaceae
Pleuroascaceae
Ploettnerulaceae
Rutstroemiaceae
Sclerotiniaceae
Solenopeziaceae
Tympanidaceae
Vibrisseaceae

Disputed or previously included families 
Amorphothecaceae - Kirk (2008) assigned to Helotiales, but reclassified under order Erysiphales.
Ascocorticiaceae -  reclassified under order Medeolariales

Phacidiaceae (also known as Bulgariaceae) - reclassified under order Phacidiales
Vandijckellaceae - identified by Crous et al. (2017), not widely accepted.

See also 
 List of Helotiales genera incertae sedis

References 

 
Leotiomycetes
Ascomycota orders